"Guns and Butter" is a song by Australian rock/pop group Do-Ré-Mi released by Virgin Records in October 1986. The song peaked at number 48 on the Australian charts.

At the 1986 Countdown Australian Music Awards, Deborah Conway was nominated for Best Female Performance in a Video.

Track listing
All tracks were written by Deborah Conway, Dorland Bray, Helen Carter and Stephen Philip.
"Guns and Butter"
"Bill the Cat"

Charts

Personnel
Do-Ré-Mi members
Dorland Bray — drums, percussion, backing vocals
Helen Carter — bass guitar, backing vocals
Deborah Conway — lead vocalist
Stephen Philip — guitar

References

1986 singles
Do-Re-Mi (band) songs